Qaraqaşlı (also, Karagashli and Karakashly) is a village and municipality in the Agsu Rayon of Azerbaijan.  It has a population of 1,458.

References 

Populated places in Agsu District